Fred la marmotte (found dead February 2, 2023) was a groundhog located in Val-d'Espoir near Percé, Quebec, whose behaviour was used to predict weather on Groundhog Day.

According to the tradition of Groundhog Day, if the enlisted groundhog sees its shadow, then spring will be delayed; if it does not see its shadow, then spring will be early.

Fred is the only groundhog located on a World Heritage Site to be used for Groundhog Day weather prediction. The original Fred, "Gros Fred", was engaged from 2010 to 2017 and again in 2019; his son "Petit Fred" stood in for the 2018 event.

Fred was found dead on February 2, 2023, coincidentally on Groundhog Day.

Past predictions

See also 
 Balzac Billy
 Buckeye Chuck
 General Beauregard Lee
 Punxsutawney Phil
 Shubenacadie Sam
 Staten Island Chuck
 Stormy Marmot
 Wiarton Willie

References

External links 
 

21st-century animal births
2023 animal deaths
Canadian culture
Individual groundhogs
Holiday characters
Individual animals in Canada
Oracular animals
Groundhog Day